Glyphostoma claudoni is a species of sea snail, a marine gastropod mollusk in the family Clathurellidae.

Description
The shell grows to a length of 13 mm.

Distribution
This species occurs in the Caribbean Sea along Colombia and Suriname.

References

External links
 

claudoni
Gastropods described in 1900